"Fearless" is the second single from American indie rock the Bravery's eponymous debut album (2005). It was released in the United Kingdom on May 23, 2005, and charted at number 43 on the UK Singles Chart. The B-side is a cover of the U2 song "An Cat Dubh". The music video shows the band playing on speedboats.

Track listings
 7-inch 9882340
 "Fearless"
 "It's All I Can Do"

 CD 9882338
 "Fearless"
 "An Cat Dubh"

 DVD 9882504
 "Fearless" (video)
 "No Brakes" (live at London Koko video)
 Image gallery

Appearances in pop culture
"Fearless" was featured in "Weeping Willow", a sixth season episode of the television series Law & Order: Criminal Intent.

Notes and references

External links
 The Bravery
 The Bravery Forum

2005 singles
2005 songs
The Bravery songs
Music videos directed by Diane Martel
Polydor Records singles
Songs written by Sam Endicott